Yuzhsky District is an administrative and municipal district (raion), one of the twenty-one in Ivanovo Oblast, Russia. It is located in the south of the oblast. Its administrative center is the town of Yuzha. Population:   28,793 (2002 Census);  The population of Yuzha accounts for 65.6% of the district's total population.

Administrative and municipal status
The town of Yuzha serves as the administrative center of the district. Prior to the adoption of the Law #145-OZ On the Administrative-Territorial Division of Ivanovo Oblast in December 2010, it was administratively incorporated separately from the district. Municipally, Yuzha is incorporated within Yuzhsky Municipal District as Yuzhskoye Urban Settlement.

References

Notes

Sources

Districts of Ivanovo Oblast
